John Feikens (December 3, 1917 – May 15, 2011) was a United States district judge of the United States District Court for the Eastern District of Michigan.

Education and career

Born December 3, 1917, in Clifton, New Jersey, Feikens received a Bachelor of Arts degree in 1939 from Calvin College and a Juris Doctor in 1941 from the University of Michigan Law School. He worked for the priorities and war allocations department of the Detrex Corporation in Detroit, Michigan from 1942 to 1946. He was in private practice in Detroit from 1946 to 1960 and from 1961 to 1970.

Federal judicial service

Feikens received a recess appointment from President Dwight D. Eisenhower on October 13, 1960, to a seat on the United States District Court for the Eastern District of Michigan vacated by Judge Clifford Patrick O`Sullivan. He was nominated to the same position by President Eisenhower on January 10, 1961. His service was terminated on September 27, 1961, after his nomination was not confirmed by the United States Senate. A previous nomination by President Eisenhower on June 10, 1960, expired without action by the Senate, prior to his recess appointment.

Feikens was nominated by President Richard Nixon on October 7, 1970, to the United States District Court for the Eastern District of Michigan, to a new seat authorized by 84 Stat. 294. He was confirmed by the Senate on November 25, 1970, and received his commission on December 1, 1970. He served as Chief Judge from 1979 to 1986. He assumed senior status on March 1, 1986. His service terminated on May 15, 2011, due to his death in Grosse Pointe Park, Michigan.

Professional associations, civic and other activities

 Director of the Detroit Bar Association (1962–1967), president 1967; trustee to the Detroit Bar Association Foundation
 Member of the American Bar Association
 State Bar of Michigan Commissioner (1965–1971)
 Member of Fellow American College of Trial Lawyers
 Director of the Economic Club of Detroit
 Co-Chairman, Michigan Civil Rights Commission, (1964–1968)
 Board of Trustees, New Detroit, Inc. (1968–1970)
 Board of Trustees, Calvin College (1968–1974)
 University of Michigan Club
 Committee of Visitors, University of Michigan Law School
 Director, Economic Club of Detroit

References

External links
 
 The Political Graveyard
 John Feikens biography at the Eastern District of Michigan

1917 births
2011 deaths
Calvin University alumni
University of Michigan Law School alumni
Judges of the United States District Court for the Eastern District of Michigan
Michigan Republican Party chairs
Lawyers from Detroit
Politicians from Clifton, New Jersey
People from Grosse Pointe Park, Michigan
United States district court judges appointed by Dwight D. Eisenhower
20th-century American judges
United States district court judges appointed by Richard Nixon
Unsuccessful recess appointments to United States federal courts
Deaths from respiratory failure